Axel Gustaf Torbjörn Enström (October 25, 1893 - March 9, 1977) was the head of Svenska Cellulosa Aktiebolaget in Sundsvall. He was managing director from 1950 to 1960 and chairman of the board from 1960 to 1965.

Biography
He was born on October 25, 1893, in Sweden.

He married Margit Lisa Magdalena Wahlberg (1900-1984) in Ytterlännäs, Västernorrland, Sweden on July 18, 1920. She was a daughter of Johanna Winblad (1859-1916) and Per Olof Bernhard Wahlberg (1852-1927). Their children include: Torbjörn Enström (1921-1983) who married Genenieve Shaw; Lennart Enström (1923-1999) who married Inga Lisa Bergengren; and Birgitta Enström (1925- ) who married Rickard Jörgen Ryott Malmros (1924-2006).

He was managing director of Svenska Cellulosa Aktiebolaget from 1950 to 1960.

On September 12, 1953, the golf course he created in Sundsvall was opened. The course was officially opened by His Royal Highness Prince Bertil. The SCA Men's Choir was established on August 28, 1957, on his initiative. His interest in male choral singing lead to the creation of choirs wherever there was an SCA run company, in Kramfors, Holmsund, Byske and Karlsvik. An icebreaking tugboat that belonged to SCA was named after him. It was later sold and renamed "Fram".

In 1953, he was elected a member of the Royal Swedish Academy of Engineering Sciences.

He was chairman of the board of Svenska Cellulosa Aktiebolaget from 1960 to 1965. He retired in 1965 and died on March 9, 1977, in Sweden.

Publications
Skogsbrukets och jordbrukets rationalisering - synpunkter på hur denna ... (1953)

Timeline
1893 Birth of Axel Enström in Sweden
1920 Marriage to Margit Lisa Magdalena Wahlberg in Ytterlännäs, Sweden on August 28
1921 Birth of Torbjörn Enström
1923 Birth of Lennart Enström
1925 Birth of Birgitta Enström
1950 Begins tenure as Director of SCA Forest Products in Sundsvall
1953 Creation of golf course in Sundsvall on September 12
1957 Creation of Men's Choir on August 28
1960 Ends tenure as Director of SCA Forest Products in Sundsvall
1960 Begins tenure as Chairman of the Board of SCA Forest Products in Sundsvall
1965 Ends tenure as Chairman of the Board of SCA Forest Products in Sundsvall
1977 Death of Axel Enström in Sundsvall, Sweden

Awards and decorations
   Commander Grand Cross of the Order of the Polar Star (6 June 1963)

References

External links
Tugboat Axel Enström
Sundsvall GK

1893 births
1977 deaths
20th-century Swedish businesspeople
Members of the Royal Swedish Academy of Engineering Sciences
SCA (company)
Commanders Grand Cross of the Order of the Polar Star